Lysosomal trafficking regulator is a vesicular transport protein associated with Chédiak–Higashi syndrome.

In melanocytic cells LYST gene expression may be regulated by MITF.

References

External links
  GeneReviews/NCBI/NIH/UW entry on Chediak-Higashi Syndrome